Pandri or Padri is a village in Gauriganj, Amethi district (formerly a part of the Sultanpur district), Uttar Pradesh in India. There is a post office, primary school, and an intermediate college and it is very sparsely populated with a group of 22 small purvas including pure vindhya lal. Pandri is located at a distance of 12 km from the district headquarter Gauriganj and 15 km from Amethi.

This village is a part of Gauriganj (Assembly constituency) and Amethi (Lok Sabha constituency).

References

External links

Villages in Amethi district